Sproing Interactive Media GmbH was an Austrian video game developer. It was founded in 2001 by Harald Riegler and Gerhard Seiler. Riegler and Seiler have owned and managed the company up to the present. The company has its headquarters in Vienna, Austria.

Sproing has published over 50 titles of varying scope. The company produces games for different platforms such as Wii, Xbox 360, PlayStation 3, PC, PlayStation 2, Xbox, Nintendo DS, PlayStation and Game Boy Advance. Panzer Tactics DS (released in 2008) was awarded the Deutscher Entwicklerpreis (German Developer Award) in the category Best German console-game. For autumn 2012, a third game of the show Schlag den Raab was announced, as both predecessors sold over 250,000 copies between them on various platforms. In November 2016, the company, at the time with roughly 100 employees the largest game studio in Austria, filed for insolvency. It would later be succeeded by Purple Lamp Studios in 2018. The company was a member of the G.A.M.E. Bundesverband der Computerspielindustrie.

Games (selection)
 Various Moorhuhn-Games
 2004: Crazy Kickers
 Since 2005: Meine Tierarztpraxis-Series (e.g. Paws and Claws: Pet Vet)
 2006: Undercover: Operation Wintersun (known as Undercover: Operation Wintersonne in German)
 2007: Undercover: Dual Motives (known as Undercover: Doppeltes Spiel in German)
 2008: Panzer Tactics DS
 2009: Cursed Mountain
 2010: Dance! It's your Stage 
 2011: Schlag den Raab – Das 2. Spiel
 2012: SkyRama
 2012: North & South
 2012: Schlag den Raab – Das 3. Spiel
 2012: Silent Hunter-Online (Beta)
 2013: Asterix & Friends
 2016: Angry Birds Holiday (cancelled)
 2017: Quarantine
 2017: Nonstop Chuck Norris
 2017: KISS - Rock City

References

External links 
 Sproing's website.
 Company profile from MobyGames

Defunct video game companies of Austria
Video game companies established in 2001
Video game companies disestablished in 2016
Companies based in Vienna
Austrian companies established in 2001
2016 disestablishments in Austria